Nicholas Pennington (born 18 December 1998) is a professional footballer who plays as a central midfielder for Wellington Phoenix. His parents are both Australians.

Early life
Born in Rome, Pennington is of Australian descent through his father who originated from Perth. He has stated his interest in representing the Australia national team.

Club career

Cagliari 
Pennington began his career with Cagliari. He made his first appearance on the bench on 27 November 2016 in a Serie A match against Udinese and the second three days later in a match against Sampdoria in the fourth round of Coppa Italia, but both times he did not appear on the field.

Loan to Olbia 
On 19 August 2017, he was loaned to Serie C club Olbia on a seasons-long loan deal. On 4 October, Pennington made his debut for Olbia as a substitute replacing Enrico Geroni in the 28th minute of a 0–0 home draw against Pistoiese. Four days later, on 8 October he played his first entire match for Olbia, a 2–1 home defeat against Robur Siena. On 18 February 2018, Pennington scored his first professional goal in the 51st minute of a 2–1 away win over Pistoiese. Pennington ended his loan to Olbia with 25 appearances, 1 goal and 1 assist.

Olbia 
At the end of the loan period, Olbia signed Pennington outright for an undisclosed fee on a three-year contract. On 19 September he played his first match of the season in a 3–2 away win over Albissola, he was replaced by Joseph Tetteh after 75 minutes. Four days later he played his first entire match of the season, a 2–1 home win over Aurora Pro Patria.

Wellington Phoenix
On 30 July 2021, Pennington signed for New Zealand club Wellington Phoenix who play in the A-League. Pennington scored his first Phoenix goal on 26 March 2022, a 97th-minute winner in a 2–1 victory over Perth Glory.

Career statistics

Club

References

External links

1998 births
Footballers from Rome
Italian people of Australian descent
Living people
Italian footballers
Cagliari Calcio players
Olbia Calcio 1905 players
Serie C players
Association football midfielders
Expatriate sportspeople in New Zealand